Lusikkahaarukka ("spoon-fork") or LuHa is a stainless steel, folding spoon-fork combination issued together with a mess kit in the Finnish Army. It is widely used in camping and outdoors activities.

The spoon portion is a slightly oversized soup spoon which makes it useful for stirring when the mess kit is used to cook rations in the field. The fork portion is rarely used as most foods are more easily eaten with the spoon. When folded, the  can be inserted (using an appropriate slot) in the Finnish army mess kit, although this is discouraged because, more often than not, it slips off from the fittings and starts to rattle around. Finnish army conscripts are allowed to carry their civilian puukkos while in uniform, and everyone is assumed to own one, so a separate knife is not needed.

The  are hard wearing, so much so that new conscripts are still issued with units manufactured during World War II.

Also known as
 Lusikkahaarukka-mysteeri – Translates as "spoon-fork mystery".
Mysteerio - Military slang.

See also
 
Splayd
Other combined utensils

References

Camping equipment
Spoons
Forks
Military food
Finnish Army